Mimachlamys is a genus of scallops, marine bivalve molluscs in the taxonomic family Pectinidae. There are at least 11 living species, including the glory scallop Mimachlamys gloriosa, and the  Mimachlamys asperrima.

Shell description
In this genus, the valves are both convex, though the left valve is more convex than the right.  The auricles, ear-like projections on either side of the hinge, are inequal in size, with the anterior always being much larger than the posterior.  The byssal notch is deep, and the valves are generally similar in sculpture.

Distribution and habitat
The habitat for this genus is temperate oceans down to a depth of several hundred meters, from southern Australia to Indonesia and north to the Philippines. Some species in the genus Mimachlamys retain their byssal threads through adulthood, and are not free swimming.

Species
Species of Mimachlamys include:
Mimachlamys albolineata
Mimachlamys asperrima
Mimachlamys australis
Mimachlamys cloacata
Mimachlamys crassicostata
Mimachlamys gloriosa
Mimachlamys nobilis
Mimachlamys sanguinea
Mimachlamys senatoria
Mimachlamys townsendi
Mimachlamys varia

References

 Lazo, D. (2007). Early Cretaceous bivalves of the Neuquén Basin, west-central Argentina: notes on taxonomy, palaeobiogeography and palaeoecology. Geological Journal, 42(2), pp. 127–142.

Pectinidae
Bivalve genera